Echedoros is a former municipality in the Thessaloniki regional unit, Greece. The seat of the municipality was in Sindos. Since the 2011 local government reform it is part of the municipality Delta, of which it is a municipal unit. The 2011 census recorded 29,367 inhabitants in the municipal unit. The municipal unit of Echedoros covers an area of 103.147 km2.  In antiquity Echedorus was a river rising in the mountains of Grestonia and falling into the Thermaic Gulf at Sindus.

References

Populated places in Thessaloniki (regional unit)
Geography of ancient Mygdonia

bg:Ехедорос